The Most Valliant Order of Taming Sari (Malay:Darjah Kebesaran Taming Sari Negeri Perak Yang Amat Perkasa) is knighthood order of the Sultanate of Perak.

Background
Founded by Sultan Idris Shah II in 1977.

Timeline of ribbon

Classes
There are six classes of the order:

Knight Grand Commander (Dato' Seri Panglima Taming Sari, post-nominal letters : S.P.T.S.)
Knight Commander (Dato' Pahlawan Taming Sari, post-nominal letters : D.P.T.S.)
Commander (Pirwira (Paduka) Taming Sari, post-nominal letters : P.T.S.)
(Hulubalang Taming Sari, post-nominal letters : H.T.S.)
Officer (Keshatriya Taming Sari, post-nominal letters : K.T.S.)
Member (Perajurit (Ahli) Taming Sari, post-nominal letters : A.T.S.)

Since 1989, the grade of P.T.S., H.T.S., K.T.S. and A.T.S. were abrogated.

Recipients

Knight Grand Commander (SPTS)
The knight grand commanders receives the title Dato’ Seri Panglima and his wife Datin Seri Panglima

 1978: Mohd Sany Abdul Ghaffar
 1978: Mohammed Hanif Omar
 1986: Mohd Ghazali Che Mat
 1986: Mohamed Hashim Mohd Ali
 1987: Abdul Wahab Nawi
 1987: Mohamed Ngah Said
 1989: Raja Nazrin Shah
 1989: Mohamed Daud Abu Bakar
 1990: Yaacob Mohd Zain
 1990: Mohd Yunus Mohd Tasi
 1991: Mohd Shariff Ishak
 1992: Abdul Rahman Abdul Hamid
 1994: Abdul Ghani Aziz
 1995: Mohammad Ali Alwi
 1996: Ismail Omar
 1996: Che Md Noor Mat Arshad
 1996: Ahmad Ramli Mohd Nor
 1997: Ahmad Saruji Che Rose
 1998: Norian Mai
 1998: Mohd Zahidi Zainuddin
 1999: Md Hashim Hussein
 1999: Abu Bakar Abdul Jamal
 2000: Zaini Mohd Said
 2002: Suleiman Mahmud
 2002: Mohd Bakri Omar
 2003: Abdullah Ahmad
 2003: Salleh Mat Som
 2004: Mohd Azumi Mohamed
 2004: Mohd Anwar Mohd Nor
 2004: Mohd Sedek Mohd Ali
 2014: Khalid Abu Bakar
 2015: Khoo Chong Kong
 2015: Raja Mohamed Affandi
 2017: Zulkiple Kassim
 2017: Noor Rashid Ibrahim
 2019: Abdul Hamid Bador
 2020: Affendi Buang
 2020: Acryl Sani Abdullah Sani
 2022: Razarudin Husain

Knight Commander (DPTS)
The knight commanders receives the title Dato’ Pahlawan and his wife Datin Pahlawan

 1978: Mohd Ghazali Che Mat
 1978: Mohd Zain Mohd Salleh
 1978: Mohamed Ngah Said
 1978: N. Selvarajah
 1978: Borhan Kuntom
 1978: Ahmad Abdul Hamid
 1979: Jaafar Onn
 1979: Chen Kwee Fong
 1979: Abdul Majid Mohd Din
 1979: Wan Yaacob Wan Ibrahim
 1980: Mior Jaafar Mior Safi
 1981: Chong Thean Bok
 1982: Osman Mohd Zain 
 1982: Ibrahim Mohamed
 1983: Nasir Mohd Diah
 1985: Yaakob Mohd Zain
 1985: Mohd Yusof Din
 1985: Shahruddin Mohd Ali
 1985: Hasnan Abdul Aziz
 1985: Mohd Yunus Mohd Tasi
 1985: Mohamed Dahalan Sulaiman
 1985: Raja Ibrahim Raja Shahriman
 1986: Zulkifli Ali
 1986: Abdul Rahman Abdul Hamid
 1986: MOHD. ALI BIN DOLLAH
 1986: IBRAHIM BIN HAJI ABDULLAH
 1986: Mohd Tahir Sijan
 1987: Mohd Kassim Ismail
 1987: Amran Ibrahim
 1987: Noordin Alaudin
 1988: Abdul Rashid Raja Badiozaman
 1988: Ang Phaik Chin
 1988: Mohd Hamidi Mohd Yusof
 1992: Zakiah Laidin
 1998: Mariman Mohd Taib
 1998: Mohd Yusof Abd Rahaman
 1998: Mohd Zambri Ismail
 2009: Zulkifli Mansor
 2009: ZULKAFLAY BIN RAHMAN
 2009: Syed Zahiruddin Putra Syed Osman
 2009: ABD. RAHMAN BIN ABD. KARIM
 2009: ABDUL GHANI BIN OTHMAN
 2009: MOHAMMAD NOH BIN MOHD SAID
 2009: KHAIRUL BAKRI BIN MUSTAFA
 2009: Hadi Ho Abdullah
 2009: Sulaiman Mohamad
 2012: Hamza Taib
 2012: Md Sani Ahmad
 2012: Mohamad Adib Abdul Samad
 2012: Mohd Shukri Dahlan
 2012: Redzuan Baharuddin
 2012: Sulaiman Mohamad
 2012: Zulkifli Hassan
 2015: Razarudin Husain
 2015: Mior Faridalathrash Wahid
 2015: Ahnar Anuar
 2015: Ruzelme Ahmad Fahimy
 2015: Nor Azam Jais
 2021: Anuar Othman
 2021: Rusli Ahmad
 2021: Felix Gonsalvez Alexander
 2021: Musa Kasmin
 2022: Abdul Halim Shaari
 2022: Safwan Ismail
 2022: Abdul Hamid Mohd Isa
 2022: Mohd Ghazalli Mohd Taha
 2022: Shazeli Kahar

See also 
 Orders, decorations, and medals of the Malaysian states and federal territories#Perak
 Orders, decorations, and medals of Perak
 Order of precedence in Perak
 List of post-nominal letters (Perak)

References 

Orders of chivalry of Malaysia
Orders, decorations, and medals of Perak